The pink-speckled shrimpgoby (Cryptocentrus leptocephalus) is a species of goby native to the western Pacific Ocean where it occurs on silty substrates in coastal reefs, lagoons, mangrove swamps and tide pools. It grows to a length of  SL.

References

pink-speckled shrimpgoby
Marine fish of Northern Australia
Fish of New Guinea
pink-speckled shrimpgoby